is a Japanese swimming coach and retired Olympic swimmer from Numazu, Shizuoka. She won the gold medal in the 200 metres breaststroke at the 1992 Summer Olympics in Barcelona, Spain. She was at the age of 14 years and 6 days when she got the medal.

External links 
 Kyoko Iwasaki's Official Blog "Kotoba no Shizuku" 

1978 births
Living people
Japanese female breaststroke swimmers
Olympic swimmers of Japan
Swimmers at the 1992 Summer Olympics
Swimmers at the 1996 Summer Olympics
Olympic gold medalists for Japan
People from Numazu, Shizuoka
Medalists at the 1992 Summer Olympics
Olympic gold medalists in swimming
Universiade medalists in swimming
Universiade bronze medalists for Japan
Medalists at the 1995 Summer Universiade